Misery Loves Company is an American sitcom television series that aired Sunday at 9:30 on Fox from October 1 until October 22, 1995.

Premise
Four guys deal with romantic trials and tribulations.

Cast
Dennis Boutsikaris as Joe
Julius Carry as Perry
Stephen Furst as Lewis
Wesley Jonathan as Connor
Christopher Meloni as Mitch
Nikki DeLoach as Tracy
Kathe Mazur as Nicky St. Hubbin

Episodes

References

External links
 

1995 American television series debuts
1995 American television series endings
1990s American sitcoms
English-language television shows
Fox Broadcasting Company original programming
Television series by ABC Studios
Television series created by Michael Jacobs